Bakersfield station may refer to:

Bakersfield station (Amtrak)
Bakersfield station (California High-Speed Rail)
Bakersfield station (Southern Pacific Railroad)

See also
Bakersfield (disambiguation)